Mykolaivka is a village in Volnovakha Raion (district) in Donetsk Oblast of eastern Ukraine, at 51.1 km SSW from the centre of Donetsk city.

Demographics
The settlement had 1512 inhabitants in 2001. Native language distribution as of the Ukrainian Census of 2001:
Ukrainian: 85.19%
Russian: 14.68%
Armenian and Slovak: 0.07%

References

Villages in Volnovakha Raion